The 1984 Virginia Slims of Houston was a women's tennis tournament played on indoor carpet courts at the Astro Arena in Houston, Texas in the United States that was part of the 1983 Virginia Slims World Championship Series. It was the 14th edition of the tournament and was held from January 30 through February 5, 1984. Third-seeded Hana Mandlíková won the singles title.

Finals

Singles
 Hana Mandlíková defeated  Manuela Maleeva 6–4, 6–2
 It was Mandlíková's 3rd title of the year and the 23rd of her career.

Doubles
 Mima Jaušovec /  Anne White defeated  Barbara Potter /  Sharon Walsh 6–4, 3–6, 7–6
 It was Jaušovec's 1st title of the year and the 15th of her career. It was White's 1st career title.

Prize money

References

External links
 ITF tournament edition details

Virginia Slims of Houston
Virginia Slims of Houston
Virginia Slims of Houston
Virginia Slims of Houston
Virginia Slims of Houston
Virginia Slims of Houston
Virginia Slims of Houston